Senator Millar may refer to:

Fran Millar (born 1949), Georgia State Senate
William Millar (politician) (1839–1913), Wisconsin State Senate

See also
Joseph Millard (1836–1922), U.S. Senator from Nebraska from 1901 to 1907
Senator Miller (disambiguation)